The state auditor of New Mexico is a constitutional officer in the executive branch of government of the U.S. state of New Mexico. 28 individuals have held the office of state auditor since statehood. The incumbent is Joseph Maestas, a Democrat.

Eligibility and term of office
No person may be elected state auditor other than a United States citizen of at least 30 years of age who has resided continuously in New Mexico for five years preceding the election. The state auditor is elected to a four-year term and is able to serve up to two consecutive terms; more terms may be served after one full term has intervened.

Powers and duties
The state auditor assures that the financial affairs of New Mexico's 1,000-plus local governments and state agencies are thoroughly examined and audited each year and may conduct, in whole or part, audits of any of the aforesaid public bodies at any time. Pursuant to this authority, the state auditor performs annual financial audits of public bodies or approves contracts entered into effect by public bodies with independent public accounting firms, otherwise known as "IPAs". Whenever an annual financial audit is performed by an independent public accounting firm rather than the Office of the State Auditor, the state auditor performs desk reviews of IPA audits for compliance with the Audit Rule promulgated by the Office of the State Auditor. In addition, the state auditor conducts special investigations of fraud, waste, and abuse of public funds or resources; collects, analyzes, and issues reports on state agency and local government audit data; and serves as an ex officio member of the State Commission of Public Records. The state auditor is sixth in the line of succession to the governor's office after the lieutenant governor, the secretary of state, the president pro tempore of the Senate, the speaker of the House, and the attorney general. In the performance of official duties, the state auditor may issue subpoenas to compel the attendance of witnesses and the production of books and records.

List of State Auditors

Notes

References

External links
State Auditor of New Mexico

New Mexico